The 2011 Indian Federation Cup was the 33rd season of the knock-out competition. On 13 August 2011 the AIFF announced that 21 clubs had been accepted to the tournament.

The tournament Qualifiers commence from 8 September to 13 September and Final Group Round quarterfinals start from 17 September. The winner of this prestigious tournament will book their place in 2012 AFC Cup.

East Bengal qualifies for 2012 AFC Cup because Salgaocar S.C. already qualified via them being I-League champions.

Teams

Qualifying round

Group A

 8 September 2011: Mohammedan SC 1 – 0 Ar-Hima
 10 September 2011: Ar-Hima 0 – 0 Vasco
 12 September 2011: Vasco 0 – 1 Mohammedan SC

Group B

 9 September 2011: Southern Samity 0 – 1 Royal Wahingdoh
 9 September 2011: United Sikkim 3 – 2 ONGC
 11 September 2011: Royal Wahingdoh 1 – 0 United Sikkim
 11 September 2011: ONGC 1 – 2 Southern Samity
 13 September 2011: Royal Wahingdoh  3 – 1 ONGC
 13 September 2011: United Sikkim  1 – 0 Southern Samity

Final group phase

Group A
Group A will play in Pune

Group B
Group B will play in Pune

Group C
Group C played in Kolkata

Group D
Group D will play in Kolkata

Semi-finals

Final

Top goal scorers

Telecast
Brand Value Communications Ltd. broadcast all 27 final group phase matches of the competition through their channels News Time Bangla and News Time Assam in West Bengal and Assam respectively. On 20 September, DD Sports announced that they would telecast the matches starting with the two games that ended the group phase on 22 September. DD Sports also aired the semi-finals and final.

See also
I-League
Federation Cup (India)

References

External links
 : www.kolkatafootball.com

  
2011
2011–12 in Indian football
2011 domestic association football cups